Pernille Nedergaard (born 5 December 1967) is a retired female badminton player from Denmark.

She won the European Badminton Championships in women's singles in 1990 and 1992. She also competed in the women's singles tournament at the 1992 Summer Olympics.

References

External links 
 
 
European results
badminton.dk

1967 births
Living people
Danish female badminton players
Olympic badminton players of Denmark
Badminton players at the 1992 Summer Olympics